Euhadra is a genus of air-breathing land snails, terrestrial pulmonate gastropod mollusks in the subfamily Bradybaeninae of the family Camaenidae. 

(This snail genus was previously placed in the family Eulotidae).

A few of the species in this genus are unusual in that specimens in those species always have left-handed "sinistral" coiling in their shells, as shown in the specimen on the right. The rest of the species in the genus are right-handed or "dextral" in the shell coiling, as is usually the case in the great majority of gastropods.

Distribution
These snails are almost endemic to Japan, but one of them are distributed in Korea.

Species
Most species in this genus have a dextral shell and 5 species are sinistral.

Dextral species
Dextral species in the genus Euhadra include:
 Euhadra amaliae (Kobelt, 1875)
 Euhadra awaensis  (Pilsbry, 1902)
 Euhadra brandtii (Kobelt, 1875)
 Euhadra callizona  (Crosse, 1871)
 Euhadra caspari (Möllendorff, 1884)
 Euhadra cecillei (Philippi, 1849)
 Euhadra congenita (E. A. Smith, 1878)
 Euhadra cyclolabris Möllendorff, 1899
 Euhadra dixoni (Pilsbry, 1900)
 Euhadra eoa (Crosse, 1868)
 Euhadra granulifera (Möllendorff, 1888)
 Euhadra herklotsi (Martens, 1861)
 Euhadra idzumonis (Pilsbry & Gulick, 1900)
 Euhadra kunoensis Kuroda in Masuda & Habe, 1989
 Euhadra latispira (Pilsbry & Hirase, 1909)
 Euhadra latispira yagurai Kuroda & Habe, 1949 
 Euhadra luhuana (G. B. Sowerby I, 1839)
 Euhadra moreletiana (Heude, 1882)
 Euhadra nachicola Kuroda, 1929
 Euhadra nesiotica (Pilsbry, 1902)
 † Euhadra pachya (Pilsbry, 1902) 
 Euhadra peliomphala  (L. Pfeiffer, 1850)
 Euhadra sadoensis (Pilsbry & Y. Hirase, 1903)
 Euhadra sandai  (Kobelt, 1879)
 Euhadra schmackeri (Möllendorff, 1888)
 Euhadra senckenbergiana (Kobelt, 1875)
 Euhadra senckenbergiana aomoriensis (Gulick & Pilsbry, 1900)
 Euhadra senckenbergiana ibukicola
 Euhadra senckenbergiana notoensis
 Euhadra senckenbergiana minoensis
 Euhadra senckenbergiana senckenbergiana
 Euhadra sigeonis Kuroda, 1944
 Euhadra subnimbosa (Kobelt, 1894)
 † Euhadra takarajimana M. Azuma & Y. Azuma, 1985 
 Euhadra tokarainsula Minato & Habe, 1982
 Euhadra yakushimana (Pilsbry & Hirase, 1903)

Sinistral species

Sinistral species in the genus Euhadra include:
 Euhadra decorata (Pilsbry & Hirase, 1903)
 Euhadra grata (Gude, 1900)
 Euhadra grata echigoensis Murayama, Takizawa & Habe, 1991
 Euhadra murayamai Habe, 1976
 Euhadra quaesita (Deshayes, 1850), Sought-after False Hadra
 Euhadra scaevola (Martens, 1877)

Species brought into synonymy
 Euhadra amphidroma Möllendorff, 1899: synonym of Trichocathaica amphidroma (Möllendorff, 1899) (original combination)
 Euhadra carphochroa Möllendorff, 1899: synonym of Bradybaena carphochroa (Möllendorff, 1899) (original combination)
 Euhadra eris Möllendorff, 1899: synonym of Bradybaena eris (Möllendorff, 1899) (original combination)
 Euhadra halpozona Möllendorff, 1899: synonym of Bradybaena halpozona (Möllendorff, 1899) (original combination)
 Euhadra hickonis Kobelt, 1879: synonym of Euhadra congenita (E. A. Smith, 1878) (junior synonym)
 Euhadra iwadensis Toba & Kuroda, 1936: synonym of Euhadra decorata decorata (Pilsbry & Hirase, 1903) (junior synonym)
 Euhadra kanmuriensis Azuma & Tada, 1969: synonym of Euhadra sandai communis Pilsbry, 1928 (junior synonym)
 Euhadra kanoi Kuroda, 1932: synonym of Nesiohelix kanoi (Kuroda, 1932) (original combination)
 Euhadra koreana (L. Pfeiffer, 1850): synonym of Fruticicola koreana (L. Pfeiffer, 1850)
 Euhadra micromphala Möllendorff, 1899: synonym of Bradybaena micromphala (Möllendorff, 1899) (original combination)
 Euhadra pekanensis H. Rolle, 1911: synonym of Satsuma pekanensis (H. Rolle, 1911) (original combination)
 Euhadra pseudocampylaea Möllendorff, 1899: synonym of Bradybaena pseudocampylaea (Möllendorff, 1899) (original combination)
 Euhadra pseudopapuina Möllendorff, 1901: synonym of Aegista pseudopapuina (Möllendorff, 1901) (original combination)
 Euhadra strauchiana Möllendorff, 1899: synonym of Bradybaena strauchiana (Möllendorff, 1899) (original combination)
 Euhadra strictotaenia Möllendorff, 1899: synonym of Bradybaena strictotaenia (Möllendorff, 1899) (original combination)
 Euhadra tenuitesta Möllendorff, 1899: synonym of Bradybaena tenuitesta (Möllendorff, 1899) (original combination)
 Euhadra tobai S. Hirase, 1929: synonym of Euhadra decorata decorata (Pilsbry & Hirase, 1903) (junior synonym)
 Euhadra tokarana Azuma, 1982: synonym of Euhadra tokarainsula tokarainsula Minato & Habe, 1982

References

Further reading 
 
 Ueshima R. & Asami T. (16 October 2003). "Evolution: Single-gene speciation by left–right reversal". Nature 425: 679. 
  Kawana M. (2007). かたつむりの世界〈マイマイ属〉 The world of land snails (Euhadra) in Japan. Nagoya, Kinmirai-sha. 332 pp.  (with English introduction)
 Yamazaki N., Ueshima R., Terrett J. A., Yokobori S., Kaifu M., Segawa R., Kobayashi T., Numachi K., Ueda T., Nishikawa K., Watanabe K. & Thomas R. H. (1997). "Evolution of pulmonate gastropod mitochondrial genomes: comparisons of complete gene organizations of Euhadra, Cepaea and Albinaria and implications of unusual tRNA secondary structures". Genetics 145: 749-758.
 Bank, R. A. (2017). Classification of the Recent terrestrial Gastropoda of the World. Last update: July 16th, 2017

External links

 
Camaenidae